Christopher Douglas Ralph (born May 13, 1977) is a Canadian actor. He is perhaps best known for his role as Tobias in the 1998 TV series Animorphs.

Filmography

Film

Television

References

1977 births
Living people
Canadian male film actors
Canadian male television actors
Canadian male voice actors
Male actors from Newfoundland and Labrador
People from St. John's, Newfoundland and Labrador
20th-century Canadian male actors
21st-century Canadian male actors